Romeo "Romică" Bunică (born 11 April 1974) is a Romanian former professional footballer who played as a forward.

Club career
Born in Râmnicu Sărat, Buzău County Bunică spent almost all his career, despite 2 seasons and a half at Otopeni, at teams from his homecounty such as: Olimpia Râmnicu Sărat, FC Gloria Buzău or Petrolul Berca. A regular player of the second and third leagues, Bunică made his Liga I debut when he was 33 years old at FC Gloria Buzău, in a 1-2 defeat against Dinamo București. The most controversial moment of Bunică's career took place on 30 November 2007, when as a player of Gloria Buzău, at that time a team with many players loaned from Steaua București and seen by many as an unofficial satellite, scored from a free kick in the last minute, goal by which Gloria would equalize Steaua, 1-1. After the match he was removed from the team, fact that caused a big media scandal.

In 2009 Bunică retired and started his manager career, managing teams such as: FC Voluntari, Otopeni or FC Gloria Buzău.

References

External links
 
 

1974 births
Living people
People from Râmnicu Sărat
Romanian footballers
Association football forwards
Liga I players
Liga II players
FC Gloria Buzău players
CS Otopeni players
Romanian football managers
FC Voluntari managers
CS Otopeni managers